This article discusses topics related to the environment of Pakistan.

Biota

Climate

Geography

Water

Climate change

Pollution
Pollution is the introduction of contaminants into the natural environment that cause adverse change. Pollution can take the form of chemical substances or energy, such as noise, heat or light. Pollutants, the components of pollution, can be either foreign substances/energies or naturally occurring contaminants. Pollution is often classed as point source or nonpoint source pollution.

Coast Pollution
Pakistan's coastline, which stretches over 1,046 km, is facing severe pollution due  to a combination of industrial, port, municipal, and transportation activities in the area.  The coastline is being overwhelmed with water-borne pollution being discharged in the  shipping process into the marine environment. A recent study found that some of the  marine life was contaminated with lead, which if consumed by humans through seafood, has been linked to anemia, kidney failure and brain damage. In fact, the study also discovered that even the mangrove forests protecting the feeder creeks from sea erosion  as well as a source of sustenance for fishermen are threatened by this pollution.

Air pollution
The Air pollution is the release of chemicals and particulates into the atmosphere. Common gaseous  pollutants include carbon monoxide, sulfur dioxide, chlorofluorocarbons (CFCs) and nitrogen oxides produced by industry and motor vehicles. Photochemical ozone and smog are created as nitrogen oxides and hydrocarbons react to sunlight. Particulate matter, or fine dust is characterized by their micrometre size PM10 to PM2.5. The air in Karachi is rapidly polluted by automobile smoke, especially Rickshaws and Buses, industrial emissions, open burning of garbage, house fires, and other particles but the government and environment organizations seems non-serious to tackle the issue timely.

Rickshaws
The two-stroke engines on rickshaws and motorcycles are one of the major polluters of air in Karachi and the rest of Pakistan. The two-stroke engines as well as defective or unturned vehicles are major polluters with carbon dioxide emissions. Two-stroke engines as well as defective vehicles using substandard lubricant are major emitters of sulfur dioxide and smoke. Automobiles operating on compressed natural gas and liquefied petroleum gas are major air polluters.

Light pollution
The Light pollution includes light trespass, over-illumination and astronomical interference.

Littering
Littering is the criminal throwing of inappropriate man-made objects, unremoved, onto public and private properties.

Noise pollution
Noise pollution which encompasses roadway noise, aircraft noise, industrial noise as well as high-intensity sonar. The noise for Karachi came to 80 dB (A), the General Noise Index x (G.N.I.) to 460, and the noise pollution level (N.P.L.) to 99 dB (A). These values are significantly higher (P less than 0.01) than the available international data.

Soil contamination
Soil contamination occurs when chemicals are released by spill or underground leakage. Among the most significant soil contaminants are hydrocarbons, heavy metals, MTBE, herbicides, pesticides and chlorinated hydrocarbons.

Radioactive contamination
Radioactive contamination resulting from 20th century activities in atomic physics, such as nuclear power generation and nuclear weapons research, manufacture and deployment. (See alpha emitters and actinides in the environment)

Thermal pollution
Thermal pollution is a temperature change in natural water bodies caused by human influence, such as use of water as coolant in a power plant.

Visual pollution
Visual pollution, which can refer to the presence of overhead power lines, motorway billboards, scarred landforms (as from strip mining), open smunicipal solid waste or space debris.

Water pollution
Water pollution id by the discharge of wastewater from commercial and industrial waste (intentionally or through spills) into surface waters; discharges of untreated domestic sewage, and chemical contaminants, such as chlorine, from treated sewage; release of waste and contaminants into surface runoff flowing to surface waters (including urban runoff and agricultural runoff, which may contain chemical fertilizers and pesticides); waste disposal and leaching into groundwater; eutrophication and littering.

Tanning
Pakistan exports Leather product using Leather production processes including tanning. In addition to the other environmental impacts of leather, the production processes have a high environmental impact, most notably due to:
 the heavy use of polluting chemicals in the tanning process
 air pollution due to the transformation process (hydrogen sulfide during dehairing and ammonia during deliming, solvent vapours).

One tonne of hide or skin generally leads to the production of 20 to 80 m3 of turbid and foul-smelling wastewater, including chromium levels of 100–400 mg/L, sulfide levels of 200–800 mg/L and high levels of fat and other solid wastes, as well as notable pathogen contamination. Pesticides are also often added for hide conservation during transport. With solid wastes representing up to 70% of the wet weight of the original hides, the tanning process comes at a considerable strain on water treatment installations.

Climate

most part of Pakistan lies in arid to semi arid zone of climate but there is a lot of variation observed in Pakistan due to the variation of relief features from lofty mountains  to low-lying area mostly climate of Pakistan is divided into four major climatic zones

1 High land climate zone (include all the mountain regions of Pakistan western and northern mountain)
2 low land climatic zone (include all the plain areas of Pakistan which  include whole of Indus plain except Indus delta)
3 arid climate zone ( this zone include all the south eastern deserts like Cholistan, Nara and Tharparker )   
4 coastal climate zone ( include whole of coastal stripe from Makran coast to Karachi coast and Sindh coastal areas of Pakistan)

Geography

Water

Energy

Protected areas

Environmental policy
Environmental affairs in Pakistan are managed and regulated by the Ministry of Environment (Pakistan), headed by the Minister for Environment (Pakistan).

Environmental issues

See also

 List of environmental issues
 Pakistan Environmental Protection Agency

External links
 Nontraditional Security Threats in Pakistan by Ali Tauqeer Sheikh (October 2011)
 Ecological and Nontraditional Security Challenges in South Asia by Dennis C. Pirages, Farooq Sobhan, Stacy D. VanDeveer and Li Li (June 2011)

References